The PlayStation 2 technical specifications describe the various components of the PlayStation 2 (PS2) video game console.

Overview
The sixth-generation hardware of the PlayStation 2 video game console consists of various components. At the heart of the console's configuration is its central processing unit (CPU), a custom RISC processor known as the Emotion Engine which operates at 294.912 MHz (299 MHz in later consoles). The CPU heavily relies on its integration with two vector processing units, known as VPU0 and VPU1, the Graphics Synthesizer, and a floating-point unit (FPU) in order to render 3D graphics. Other components, such as the system's DVD-ROM optical drive and DualShock 2 controller, provide the software and user control input.

PlayStation 2 software is distributed on CD-ROM and DVD-ROM. In addition, the console can play audio CDs and DVD movies, and is backwards compatible with original PlayStation games. This is accomplished through the inclusion of the original PlayStation's CPU which also serves as the PS2's I/O processor, clocked at 36.864 MHz in PS2 mode. The PS2 also supports limited functionality with the original PlayStation memory cards and controllers. The PS2's DualShock 2 controller is an upgraded version of the PlayStation's DualShock with analog face, shoulder and D-pad buttons replacing the digital buttons of the original. Like its predecessor, the DualShock 2 controller features force feedback technology.

The standard PlayStation 2 memory card has an 8 MB capacity and uses Sony's MagicGate encryption. This requirement prevented the production of memory cards by third parties who did not purchase a MagicGate license. Memory cards without encryption can be used to store PlayStation game saves, but PlayStation games would be unable to read from or write to the card such a card could only be used as a backup. There are a variety of non-Sony manufactured memory cards available for the PlayStation 2, allowing for a larger memory capacity than the standard 8 MB. However their use is unsupported and compatibility is not guaranteed. These memory cards can have up to 128 MB storage space.

The console also features USB and IEEE 1394 expansion ports. Compatibility with USB and IEEE 1394 devices is dependent on the software supporting the device. For example, the PS2 BIOS will not boot an ISO image from a USB flash drive or operate a USB printer, as the machine's operating system does not include this functionality. By contrast, Gran Turismo 4 and Tourist Trophy are programmed to save screenshots to a USB mass storage device and print images on certain USB printers. A PlayStation 2 HDD can be installed via the expansion bay in the back of the console, and was required to play certain games, notably the popular Final Fantasy XI.

Central processing unit

 CPU: MIPS III R5900-based "Emotion Engine", clocked at 294.912 MHz (299 MHz on newer versions), with 128-bit SIMD capabilities 
 250-nm CMOS manufacturing (ending with 65-nm CMOS), 13.5 million transistors, 225 mm² die size, 15 W dissipation (combined EE+GS in SCPH-7500x and later SCPH-7000x): 86 mm², 53.5 million transistors) (combined EE+GS+RDRAM+DRAM in SCPH-7900x ended with 65 nm CMOS design)
 CPU core: MIPS R5900 (COP0), 64-bit, little endian (mipsel). CPU is a superscalar, in-order execution 2-issue design with 6-stage long integer pipelines, 32 32-bit GPR registers, 32 128-bit SIMD linear scalar registers, two 64-bit integer ALUs, 128-bit load-store unit (LSU) and a branch execution unit (BXU).
 Instruction set: MIPS III, MIPS IV subset with Sony's proprietary 107 vector SIMD multimedia instructions (MMI). The custom instruction set was implemented by grouping the two 64-bit integer ALUs.
 32-bit FPU coprocessor (COP1) with 6-stage long pipeline (floating point multiply accumulator × 1, floating point divider × 1). FPU is not IEEE compliant.
 Two 32-bit VLIW-SIMD vector units at 294.912 MHz: VPU0 and VPU1 (floating point multiply accumulator × 9, floating point divider × 1) each VPU contains a vector unit (VU), instruction cache, data cache and interface unit. Each vector unit also has upper execution unit containing 4 × FMAC and lower execution unit containing FDIV, integer ALU, load-store unit, branch logic, 16 16-bit integer registers and 32 128-bit floating point registers. VPU1 has an additional EFU unit.
 VPU0 (COP2; FMAC × 4, FDIV × 1) is tightly coupled with the main CPU and is typically used for polygon and geometry transformations (under parallel or serial connection), physics and other gameplay related tasks
 VPU1 (Elementary Functional Unit, EFU; FMAC × 5, FDIV × 2) operates independently controlled by microcode, parallel to the CPU core, is typically used for polygon and geometry transformations, clipping, culling, lighting and other visual based calculations (texture matrix able for 2 coordinates (UV/ST))
 Parallel: results of VU0/FPU sent as another display list via MFIFO (for e.g. complex characters/vehicles/etc.)
 Serial: results of VU0/FPU sent to VU1 (via 3 methods) and can act as an optional geometry pre-processor that does all base work to update the scene every frame (for e.g. camera, perspective, boning and laws of movement such as animations or physics)
 Image Processing Unit (IPU): MPEG-2 compressed image macroblock layer decoder allowing playback of DVDs and game FMV. It also allowed vector quantization for 2D graphics data.
 Memory management unit (MMU), RDRAM controller and DMA controller: handle memory access within the system
 Cache memory: 16 KB instruction cache, 8 KB + 16 KB scratchpad (ScrP) data cache 
 Scratchpad (SPR) is extended area of memory visible to the EE CPU. This extended memory provides 16 kilobytes of fast RAM available to be used by the application. Scratchpad memory can be used to store temporary data that is waiting to be sent via DMA or for any other temporary storage that the programmer can define.

Interfaces
 I/O processor interconnection: remote procedure call over a serial link, DMA controller for bulk transfer
 Main RDRAM memory bus. Bandwidth: 3.2 GB/s
 Graphics interface (GIF), DMA channel that connects the EE CPU to the GS co-processor. To draw something to the screen, one must send render commands to the GS via the GIF channel: 64-bit, 150 MHz bus, maximum theoretical bandwidth of 1.2 GB/s.
 Display lists generated by CPU/VPU0 and VPU1 are sent to the GIF, which prioritizes them before dispatching them to the Graphics Synthesizer for rendering.
 Vector Unit Interface (VIF), consists of two DMA channels VIF0 for VPU0 and VIF1 for VPU1. Vector units and the main CPU communicate via VIF DMA channels.
 SIF – Serial Interface or Subsystem Interface which consists of 3 DMA channels:
 Subsystem Interface 0 (SIF0) and Subsystem Interface 1 (SIF1), used for communication between the EE main CPU and IOP co-processor. These are serial DMA channels where both CPUs can send commands and establish communication through an RPC protocol.
 Subsystem Interface 2 (SIF2), used for backwards compatibility with PS1 games and debugging.

Performance
 Floating point performance: 6.2 GFLOPS (single precision 32-bit floating point)
 FPU 0.64 GFLOPS
 VU0 2.44 GFLOPS
 VU1 3.08 GFLOPS (Including internal 0.64 GFLOPS EFU)
 Tri-strip geometric transformation (VU0+VU1): 150 million vertices per second
 3D CG geometric transformation with raw 3D perspective operations (VU0+VU1): 66–80+ million vertices per second
 3D CG geometric transformations at peak bones/movements/effects (textures)/lights (VU0+VU1, parallel or series): 15–20 million vertices per second
 Lighting: 38 million polygons/second
 Fog: 36 million polygons/second
 Curved surface generation (Bezier): 16 million polygons/second
 Image processing performance: 150 million pixels/second
 Actual real-world polygons (per frame): 500–650k at 30FPS, 250–325k at 60FPS
 Instructions per second: 6,000 MIPS (million instructions per second)

System memory
 Main memory: 32 MB PC800 32-bit dual-channel (2x 16-bit) RDRAM (Direct Rambus DRAM) @ 400 MHz, 3.2 GB/s peak bandwidth

Graphics processing unit
 Parallel rendering processor with embedded DRAM "Graphics Synthesizer" (GS) clocked at 147.456 MHz
 279 mm² die (combined EE+GS in SCPH-7500x: 86 mm², 53.5 million transistors)
 Programmable CRT controller (PCRTC) for output
 Pixel pipelines: 16 without any texture mapping units (TMU), however half of pixel pipelines can perform texturing, so fillrate is either 16 pixels per clock with untextured 2400 Mpixels; or 8 pixels per clock with 1200 megapixels with bilinear texturing, and 1200 megatexels (bilinear).
 Video output resolution: Variable from 256×224 to 1920×1080
 4 MB of embedded DRAM as video memory (an additional 32 MB of main memory can be used as video memory); 48 gigabytes per second peak bandwidth
 Texture buffer bandwidth: 9.6 GB/s
 Frame buffer bandwidth: 38.4 GB/s
 eDRAM bus width: 2560-bit (composed of three independent buses: 1024-bit write, 1024-bit read, 512-bit read/write)
 Pixel configuration: RGB:alpha, 24:8, 15:1; 16-, 24-, or 32-bit Z-buffer
 Display color depth: 32-bit (RGBA: 8 bits each)
 Dedicated connection to main CPU and VU1
 Overall pixel fillrate: 16 × 147Mpix/s = 2.352 gigapixel/s
 1.2 gigapixel/s (with Z-buffer, alpha, and texture)
 With no texture, flat shaded: 2.4Gpix/s (75,000,000 32-pixel raster triangles)
 With 1 full texture (diffuse map), Gouraud shaded: 1.2Gpix/s (37,750,000 32-bit pixel raster triangles)
 With 2 full textures (diffuse map and specular, alpha, or other), Gouraud shaded: 0.6Gpix/s (18,750,000 32-bit pixel raster triangles)
 Texture fillrate: 1.2 Gtexel/s
 Sprite drawing rate: 18.75 million/s (8×8 pixels)
 Particle drawing rate: 150 million/s
 Polygon drawing rate: 75 million/s (small polygon)
 50 million/s (48-pixel quad with Z and A)
 30 million/s (50-pixel triangle with Z and A)
 25 million/s (48-pixel quad with Z, A and T)
 16 million/s (75-pixel triangle with Z, A, T and fog)
 VESA (maximum 1280×1024 pixels)
 3 rendering paths (path 1, 2 and 3) GS effects include: Dot3 bump mapping (normal mapping), mipmapping, spherical harmonic lighting, alpha blending, alpha test, destination alpha test, depth test, scissor test, transparency effects, framebuffer effects, post-processing effects, perspective-correct texture mapping, edge-AAx2 (poly sorting required), bilinear, trilinear texture filtering, multi-pass, palletizing (6:1 ratio 4-bit; 3:1 ratio 8-bit), offscreen drawing, framebuffer mask, flat shading, Gouraud shading, cel shading, dithering, texture swizzling.
 Multi-pass rendering ability
 Four passes: 300 Mpixel/s (300 Mpixels/s divided by 32 pixels = 9,375,000 triangles/s lost every four passes)

Audio
 Audio: "SPU1+SPU2" (SPU1 in question is the CPU clocked at 8 MHz; SPU2 is the SPU from the PS1)
 Sound Memory: 2 MB
 Number of voices: 48 hardware channels of ADPCM on SPU2 plus software-mixed definable, programmable channels
 Sampling Frequency: 44.1 kHz or 48 kHz (selectable)
 PCM audio source
 Digital effects include:
 Pitch Modulation
 Envelope
 Looping
 Digital Reverb
 Load up to 512K of sampled waveforms
 Supports MIDI Instruments
 Output: Dolby Digital 5.1 Surround sound, DTS (Full motion video only), later games achieved matrix encoded 5.1 surround during gameplay through Dolby Pro Logic II

I/O processor (IOP)
 Input Output Processor (IOP)
 I/O Memory: 2 MB EDO DRAM
 CPU Core: Original PlayStation CPU (MIPS R3000A clocked at 33.8688 MHz or 36.864 MHz+PS1 GTE and MDEC for backwards compatibility with PS1 games)
 Automatically underclocked to 33.8688 MHz to achieve hardware backwards compatibility with original PlayStation format games.
 Sub Bus: 32-bit
 Connection to: SPU and CD/DVD controller.
Replaced with the PowerPC-based "Deckard" IOP with 4 MB SDRAM starting with SCPH-7500x.

Connectivity
 2 proprietary PlayStation controller ports (250 kHz clock for PS1 and 500 kHz for PS2 controllers)
 2 proprietary Memory Card slots using MagicGate encryption (250 kHz for PS1 cards. Up to 2 MHz for PS2 cards with an average sequential read/write speed of 130 kbit/s)
 2 USB 1.1 ports with an OHCI-compatible controller
 AV Multi Out (Composite video, S-Video, RGBS (SCART), RGsB (SCART or VGA connector), YPBPR (component), and D-Terminal)
 RFU DC Out
 S/PDIF Digital Out
 Expansion Bay for 3.5-inch HDD and Network Adaptor (required for HDD, SCPH-300xx to 500xx only) 
 PC Card slot for Network Adaptor (PC Card type) and External Hard Disk Drive (SCPH-10000, SCPH-15000, SCPH-18000 models)
  Emotion Engine (EE) includes an on-chip Serial I/O port (SIO) used internally by the EE's kernel to output debugging and messages and to start the kernel debugger.
 Ethernet port (Slim only) 
 i.LINK S400 (also known as FireWire 400 or IEEE 1394a) (SCPH-10000 to 3900x only) 
 Infrared remote control port (SCPH-500xx and newer)

 Standard RGB mode only allows interlaced modes up to 480i (NTSC) and 576i (PAL) and progressive modes up to 240p. A display or adapter capable of sync on green (RGsB) is necessary for higher modes. Furthermore, the PS2's Macrovision copy protection isn't compatible with either RGB mode, and thus DVDs cannot be played with RGB. However, motherboard modifications have been known to bypass these issues.
 VGA connector is only available for progressive-scan supported games, homebrew-enabled systems, and Linux for PlayStation 2, and requires a monitor that supports RGsB, or "sync on green" signals.
 Contrary to popular belief, the PS2's YPBPR/component output does fully support 240p outputs, including games from the original PlayStation. However, 240p isn't part of the YPBPR standard, and thus not all TVs and HDTVs support it. Upscaling can be used as a workaround.

Optical disc drive
 Disc Drive type: proprietary interface through a custom micro-controller + DSP chip. 24x speed CD-ROM [3.6 MB/s], 4x speed DVD-ROM [5.28 MB/s] — region-locked with copy protection.
 Supported Disc Media: PlayStation 2 format CD-ROM, PlayStation format CD-ROM, CD-DA, PlayStation 2 format DVD-ROM, DVD Video. DVD5 (Single-layer, 4.7 GB) and DVD9 (Dual-layer, 8.5 GB) supported. Later models starting with SCPH-500xx are DVD+RW and DVD-RW compatible.

See also
 PlayStation technical specifications
 PlayStation 3 technical specifications
 PlayStation 4 technical specifications

References

Hardware
Video game hardware